Tank station may refer to:

Filling station
Compressed air energy storage